The three-banded courser (Rhinoptilus cinctus) is a species of bird in the family Glareolidae.
It is found in Angola, Botswana, Ethiopia, Kenya, Namibia, Rwanda, Somalia, Somaliland, South Africa, South Sudan, Tanzania, Uganda, Zambia, and Zimbabwe.

Subspecies
There are five subspecies of three-banded courser:
R. c. mayaudi, (Érard, Hemery & Pasquet, 1993): Ethiopia & northern Somalia
R. c. balsaci, (Érard, Hemery & Pasquet, 1993): southern Somalia & northeast Kenya
R. c. cinctus, (Heuglin, 1863): southeast South Sudan & northwest Kenya
R. c. emini, (Zedlitz, 1914): southern Kenya, Tanzania & northern Zambia
R. c. seeboehmi, (Sharpe, 1893): southern Angola & northern Namibia to Zimbabwe & northern South Africa

Gallery

References

External links
Image at ADW
 Three-banded courser - Species text in The Atlas of Southern African Birds.

three-banded courser
Birds of East Africa
Birds of Southern Africa
three-banded courser
Taxa named by Theodor von Heuglin
Taxonomy articles created by Polbot